Thomas Kaauwai Kaulukukui (January 22, 1913 – March 9, 2007) was an American football player and coach. He served as the head coach at the University of Hawaii in 1941, as co-head coach with Eugene Gill, and from 1946 to 1950. From 1956–1959 he served as head coach of ʻIolani preparatory school in Honolulu.

Kaulukukui was a standout college athlete who earned 17 letters in five sports and was the University of Hawaii's first All-American football player. He was nicknamed "Grass Shack" by legendary sportswriter Grantland Rice. His number, #32, is only one of two numbers to have ever been retired by the Hawaii football program.

Head coaching record

Football

References

External links
 Hawaii Sports Hall of Fame profile
 

1913 births
2007 deaths
American football halfbacks
Hawaii Rainbow Warriors and Rainbow Wahine athletic directors
Hawaii Rainbow Warriors baseball coaches
Hawaii Rainbow Warriors football coaches
Hawaii Rainbow Warriors football players
People from Hilo, Hawaii
Sportspeople from Honolulu
Coaches of American football from Hawaii
Players of American football from Honolulu
Native Hawaiian sportspeople
Baseball coaches from Hawaii